The 1920-22 Jabal al-Gharbi civil war was a conflict which occurred in the Nafusa Mountains and surrounding areas, in what is today the country of Libya, fought between local tribal leaders competing for political offices in the Tripolitanian Republic.

References

Civil wars involving the states and peoples of Africa
Conflicts in 1920
History of Tripolitania
1920 in Libya